'Billy Rose's Jumbo' is the soundtrack album to the 1962 film of the same name: featuring Doris Day, Stephen Boyd, Jimmy Durante, and Martha Raye.  Columbia Masterworks Records released the recording on November 12, 1962 under catalog numbers OL-5860 (monaural LP) and OS-2260 (stereophonic). "Over and Over Again" was released as a single on CBS with "This Can't Be Love" as the B-side.

Track listing
"Over and Over Again" (Rodgers, Hart)—Doris Day 
"The Circus is on Parade" (Richard Rodgers, Lorenz Hart)—Doris Day, Jimmy Durante & Martha Raye 
"Why Can't I?" (Rodgers, Hart)—Doris Day & Martha Raye 
"This Can't Be Love" (Rodgers, Hart)—Doris Day 
"The Most Beautiful Girl in the World" (Rodgers, Hart)—Stephen Boyd (dubbed by James Joyce)
"My Romance" (Rodgers, Hart)—Doris Day
"The Most Beautiful Girl in the World" - Reprise—Jimmy Durante 
"Little Girl Blue" (Rodgers, Hart)—Doris Day
"Sawdust, Spangles and Dreams" (Roger Edens) - Finale—Entire Cast

References

1962 soundtrack albums
Doris Day soundtracks
Columbia Records soundtracks
Musical film soundtracks